Evelyn Baring, 1st Baron Howick of Glendale,  (29 September 1903 – 10 March 1973, aged 69) was Governor of Southern Rhodesia from 1942 to 1944, High Commissioner for Southern Africa from 1944 to 1951, and Governor of Kenya from 1952 to 1959. Baring played an integral role in the suppression of the Mau Mau rebellion. Together with Colonial Secretary Alan Lennox-Boyd, Baring played a significant role in the government's efforts to deal with the rebellion, and see Kenya through to independence. Baring was aware of abuses against Mau Mau detainees.

Education and early career 
Baring followed in the footsteps of his father, the famed "Maker of Modern Egypt"–– Evelyn Baring, 1st Earl of Cromer.  Baring went to Winchester College and then to New College, Oxford, graduating from Oxford University with First Class Honours in Modern History before serving in the Indian Civil Service. He then joined Britain's Foreign Office, where he was sent first to Southern Rhodesia before being posted in South Africa as High Commissioner.

Seretse Khama
In 1949, while serving as High Commissioner for Southern Africa, Baring played a key role in preventing Seretse Khama, the heir to the throne of the Bechuanaland Protectorate from assuming the throne; doing so on the ground that Khama's marriage to a white woman, Ruth Williams, was opposed by the white-minority government of South Africa, a neighbouring state which had recently implemented a system of racial segregation known as apartheid.

Working in close collaboration with Percivale Liesching, who was serving as Under-Secretary of State for Commonwealth Affairs at the time, Baring was able to persuade government ministers to prevent Khama from assuming the throne of Bechuanaland, instead mandating him to stay in a government-imposed exile in London, which lasted until 1956.

Governorship in Kenya

As Governor of Kenya, Baring declared a State of Emergency on 20 October 1952 before launching Operation Jock Scott, which targeted alleged Mau Mau leaders, especially Jomo Kenyatta.

In June 1957, Baring passed on to Alan Lennox-Boyd a secret memorandum written by Eric Griffith-Jones, the attorney general of Kenya, which described the abuse of Mau Mau detainees. The paper alleges that Baring supplied a covering letter that asserted that inflicting "violent shock" was the only way of suppressing the Mau Mau rebellion.

Career after Kenya
Baring left Kenya in 1959. He returned to his family estate of Howick Hall, which was inherited by his wife Lady Mary Cecil Grey, daughter of Charles Grey, 5th Earl Grey. He was known to enjoy birdwatching. He later accepted a post with the government's Colonial Development Corporation.

Marriage and children
Baring married Lady Mary Cecil Grey, daughter of Charles Grey, 5th Earl Grey, and Lady Mabel Laura Georgiana Palmer (daughter of William Palmer, 2nd Earl of Selborne), on 24 April 1935.  They had three children:

 Hon Katherine Mary Alice Baring (born 30 March 1936), married Sir Humphry Wakefield, 2nd Bt.
 Charles Evelyn Baring, 2nd Baron Howick of Glendale (born 30 December 1937)
 Hon Elizabeth Beatrice Baring (born 10 January 1940), married Nicholas Albany Gibbs.

Baring died on 10 March 1973 at the age of 69 and was succeeded in the barony by his son, Charles.

Honours
Baring was created:

 Knight Commander of the Order of St Michael and St George (KCMG) in 1942, advanced to GCMG in 1955.
 Knight Commander of the Royal Victorian Order (KCVO) in 1947.
 1st Baron Howick of Glendale in 1960
 Knight of the Order of the Garter (KG) in 1972.

Arms

Family tree

References

External links
 Baring administrative tactics
Mau Mau torture victims to receive compensation – Hague

 

1903 births
1973 deaths
British people of the Mau Mau Uprising
Colonial governors and administrators of Kenya
Governors of Southern Rhodesia
Ambassadors and High Commissioners of the United Kingdom to South Africa
Knights Commander of the Royal Victorian Order
Knights Grand Cross of the Order of St Michael and St George
Knights of the Garter
Baring, Evelyn
Evelyn
British Kenya people
Hereditary barons created by Elizabeth II